Spring Point is a town in Acklins, Bahamas and serves as its capital. As of 2010, it had a population of 36.

This town's primary transport methods are boat and airplane, with Spring Point Airport serving its area.

References 

Populated places in the Bahamas